Spice Doubt is a live album by English band Ozric Tentacles. Released in 1998, it is the soundtrack of the band's live webcast in the summer of that year. The Special plastic bag around the cd contains oil and 2 plastic fish floating inside.

Track listing

 "Cat DNA" (Ozric Tentacles) - (8:11)
 "Eternal Wheel" (Ozric Tentacles) - (9:31)
 "Sploosh!" (Ozric Tentacles) - (7:04)
 "Ahu Belahu" (Wynne) - (2:46)
 "Papyrus" (Egan, Geelaní, Lenox, Wynne) - (6:30)
 "Oolite Grove and Citadel Jam" (Egan, Geelaní, Lenox, Prince, Wynne) - (10:28)
 "Oddentity" (Geelaní, Lenox, Prince, Wynne) - (7:22)
 "Dissolution (The Clouds Disperse)" (Hinton, Pepler, Wynne, Wynne) - (10:08)
 "Myriapod" (Egan, Geelaní, Hinton, Pepler, Wynne) - (5:48)
 "Spice Doubt" (Ozric Tentacles) - (9:43)

Band personnel
 Ed Wynne - guitar, synthesizers
 Seaweed (Christopher Lenox-Smith) - synthesizers
 John Egan - flute, bansuri, ney
 Zia Geelani - bass guitar
 Rad (Conrad Prince) - percussion
 Simon Eddie Baker - liner notes
 Ian Waters - engineer

References

Ozric Tentacles albums
1998 live albums